Liover Peguero (born December 31, 2000) is a Dominican professional baseball shortstop for the Pittsburgh Pirates of Major League Baseball (MLB).

Career

Arizona Diamondbacks
Peguero signed with the Arizona Diamondbacks as an international free agent in July 2017. He spent his first professional season in 2018 with the Dominican Summer League Diamondbacks and Arizona League Diamondbacks, batting .259 with one home run and 21 RBIs over 41 games. In 2019, he played for the Missoula Osprey and Hillsboro Hops and slashed .326/.382/.485 with five home runs, 38 RBIS, and 11 stolen bases over sixty games.

Pittsburgh Pirates
On January 27, 2020, the Diamondbacks traded Peguero and Brennan Malone to the Pittsburgh Pirates for Starling Marte. He did not play a minor league game in 2020 since the season was cancelled due to the COVID-19 pandemic. The Pirates invited him to their Spring Training in 2021. He spent the season with the Greensboro Grasshoppers, slashing .270/.332/.444 with 14 home runs, 45 RBIs, and 28 stolen bases over ninety games. Pittsburgh selected his contract and added him to their 40-man roster after the season.

Peguero was called up to the Pirates' major league roster on June 17, 2022, replacing Tucupita Marcano. He made his major league debut the next day, getting one hit and a walk in four plate appearances in a 7-5 loss to the San Francisco Giants.

See also
 List of Major League Baseball players from the Dominican Republic

References

External links

2000 births
Living people
Major League Baseball players from the Dominican Republic
Major League Baseball shortstops
Pittsburgh Pirates players
Dominican Summer League Diamondbacks players
Arizona League Diamondbacks players
Missoula Osprey players
Hillsboro Hops players
Greensboro Grasshoppers players
Altoona Curve players